Glaphyrus maurus is a species of beetles belonging to the family Glaphyridae.

Description
Glaphyrus maurus has a blue-green body, a convex thorax, glabrous elytra and a yellowish hairy abdomen.

Distribution
This species is present in North Africa (Algeria, Morocco, Mauritania, Tunisia).

References

Glaphyridae
Beetles described in 1758
Taxa named by Carl Linnaeus